Gustave Hendrickson is an American former professional ice hockey player and head coach. He was in charge of the program at Minnesota–Duluth for seven seasons.

Career
Hendrickson played for Michigan State for three seasons in the early 1960s, helping the team to a third-place finish in the WCHA tournament during his final year of eligibility. After leaving East Lansing Hendrickson found his way behind the bench at Grand Rapids High School. After building a successful program he accepted the post at Minnesota–Duluth, taking his assistant Mike Sertich along for the ride. Hendrickson built the program slowly, finishing out of the playoffs in each of his first two seasons before positive results started to show. By his fourth year it appeared that Hendrickson had the Bulldogs primed to take the next step; led by future Olympic gold medalists Mark Pavelich and John Harrington Minnesota–Duluth compiled their second 20+ win season in program history and achieved a #1 national ranking for a time. Unfortunately for Hendrickson the team slumped after 1978–79 posting losing records in each of the next three seasons. He was let go in 1982 and replaced by his assistant, Sertich.

Head coaching record

College

References

External links

Living people
Year of birth missing (living people)
American ice hockey coaches
Minnesota Duluth Bulldogs men's ice hockey coaches
Michigan State Spartans men's ice hockey players
Ice hockey coaches from Minnesota
People from Eveleth, Minnesota
American men's ice hockey defensemen
Ice hockey players from Minnesota